(Chet Baker Sings) It Could Happen to You is an album by jazz trumpeter and vocalist Chet Baker. It follows a formula similar to two other Baker albums, Chet Baker Sings (1954) and Chet Baker Sings and Plays with Bud Shank, Russ Freeman & Strings (recorded in 1955, released in 1964) in which he sings traditional pop standards in a jazzy fashion. Unlike the aforementioned records, on It Could Happen to You, on a few tracks, Baker plays no trumpet whatsoever, opting to scat in place of an instrumental solo.

In 2010, it was remastered and reissued on CD by Original Jazz Classics with two previously unissued takes.

Reception

The Allmusic review by Lindsay Planer awarded the album 4 stars and states:

Track listing

1987 CD reissue bonus tracks

2010 CD reissue
"Do It the Hard Way" – 3:03
"I'm Old Fashioned" – 5:06
"You're Driving Me Crazy" – 2:56
"It Could Happen to You" – 2:53
"My Heart Stood Still" – 3:28
"The More I See You" – 3:06
"Everything Happens to Me" – 5:05
"Dancing on the Ceiling" – 3:09
"How Long Has This Been Going On?" – 4:10
"Old Devil Moon" – 2:58
"While My Lady Sleeps" [Take 10] – 4:22
"You Make Me Feel So Young" [Take 5] – 3:41
"The More I See You" [Take 8] – 2:51
"Everything Happens to Me" [Take 2] – 4:51

Personnel
Chet Baker – vocals, trumpet
Kenny Drew – piano
George Morrow (#1–2, 5, 7–8, 14), Sam Jones (#3–4, 6, 9–13) – bass
Philly Joe Jones (#1–2, 5–8, 10–14), Dannie Richmond (#3–4, 9) – drums

References

1958 albums
Riverside Records albums
Chet Baker albums
Vocal jazz albums